Kateřina Holubcová-Jakešová (born June 28, 1976 in Ústí nad Labem) is a former Czech biathlete.

Career 
 World Championships
 2003 - gold medal on the 15 km, bronze on the sprint

References
 
 

1976 births
Living people
Czech female biathletes
Olympic biathletes of the Czech Republic
Biathletes at the 2006 Winter Olympics
Biathletes at the 2002 Winter Olympics
Biathletes at the 1998 Winter Olympics
Sportspeople from Ústí nad Labem
Biathlon World Championships medalists